Sau Mau Ping Central is one of the 37 constituencies in the Kwun Tong District of Hong Kong which was created in 2015.

The constituency loosely covers part of Sau Mau Ping Estate with the estimated population of 19,749.

Councillors represented

Election results

2010s

References

Constituencies of Hong Kong
Constituencies of Kwun Tong District Council
2015 establishments in Hong Kong
Constituencies established in 2015
Sau Mau Ping